Wir kriegen euch alle (Loosely translated as "We'll Get You All") is the second album by the East German punk band Feeling B.  It was released in 1991.

Track list
Ich such die DDR (I Search For The DDR)
Every Night
Dumdum Geschoß (Dumdum Bullet)
You Can't Beat the Feeling B
Slamersong
Izrael
Schlendrian (Spend)
Soviel was ich sah (So Much of What I Saw)
Hopla He
Schampuuu-Schaum (Shampooo-Foam)
Finale
Unter dem Pflaster (Under The Pavements)
Du findest keine Ruh (You Can't Find Rest)
Revolution 89

1991 albums
Feeling B albums